Poiseux is a commune in the Nièvre department in central France.

See also
Communes of the Nièvre department

References

Communes of Nièvre